The Dushihin Formation is an Early Cretaceous (Aptian) geologic formation in the Övörkhangai Province of Mongolia. The formation preserves fossils of Psittacosaurus mongoliensis and fossil eggs described as Trachoolithus faticanus.

Description 
The formation comprises concretionary, calcareous claystones and concretionary, brown, gray, green, blue, calcareous claystones with large flattened lime concretions. Within  in the formation is a lens of lighter grayish-brown clay with green and blue spots and small lime concretions. In the lens is also an inclusion of blue, pale purple-spotted aleurite. The depositional environment has been interpreted as lacustrine.

Fossil content 
The following fossils were reported from the lacustrine claystones and conglomerates of the formation:
 Dinosaurs
 Psittacosaurus mongoliensis
 Sauropoda indet.
 Theropoda indet.
 Fossil eggs
 Trachoolithus faticanus
 Elongatoolithidae indet.
 Spheroolithidae indet.
 Squamata
 Paramacellodidae indet.

See also 

 List of dinosaur-bearing rock formations
 List of stratigraphic units with dinosaur eggs
 Andaikhudag Formation
 Khuren Dukh Formation
 Tsagaantsav Formation

References

Bibliography 

 
 
 
 

Geologic formations of Mongolia
Lower Cretaceous Series of Asia
Cretaceous Mongolia
Aptian Stage
Conglomerate formations
Shale formations
Lacustrine deposits
Ooliferous formations
Paleontology in Mongolia
Formations